The Sahitya Akademi Award is an annual award, given by the Sahitya Akademi (India's National Academy of Letters), to writers in 24 Indian languages. The award was instituted and first awarded in 1955. The award for Sanskrit was first given in 1956. The first five awards went to works in other languages, dealing with Sanskrit culture. Since 1967, the award has been given only to works in Sanskrit. The list of Sanskrit language writers who have won the award is given below.

Sahitya Akademi Award winners for Sanskrit

(No Awards in 1955, 1957, 1958, 1959, 1960, 1962, 1965, 1969, 1971, 1972, 1975, 1976, 1978 and 2014)

Bal Sahitya Puraskar
The Sahitya Akademi also awards a "Bal Sahitya Puraskar", for children's literature. Winners of this award for Sanskrit include:

Yuva Puraskar 
Books published by an author of the age of 35 and below.

References

 
Sahitya Akademi Award
Sanskrit